Rogačevo is a small village located in the north-western part of North Macedonia, 26 km away from the city of Tetovo and 1 km away from the village of Jažince, the border crossing point with Kosovo. It used to be part of the former municipality of Vratnica.

Rogacevo is situated in the upper part of the Polog plain, at the foothills of the northern part of the Šar Mountains, under the Ljuboten peak.  Around a hundred houses are present with about 500 people living here.  Since the time the village was founded, it has been Christian Orthodox.

According to the 2002 census, the village had a total of 347 inhabitants.

References

External links 
 Rogacevo ... my home - website about Rogacevo

Villages in Jegunovce Municipality
Šar Mountains